Michail Elgin and Alexandre Kudryavtsev were the defending champions, but decided not to participate.
Third seeds Lee Hsin-han and Peng Hsien-Yin won the title by defeating Brydan Klein and Yasutaka Uchiyama 6–7(5–7), 6–4, [10–4] in the final.

Seeds

Draw

Draw

References
 Main Draw

Karshi Challenger - Doubles
Karshi Challenger